Kolar (also Romanized as Kolor; also known as Kūlar) is a village in Hayat Davud Rural District, in the Central District of Ganaveh County, Bushehr Province, Iran.  census, its population was 211, in 50 families.

References 

Populated places in Ganaveh County